Kourakis is a Greek surname. It is the surname of:
 Chris Kourakis (born 1958), Greek-Australian lawyer and Chief Justice of the Supreme Court of South Australia.
 Tasos Kourakis (born 1948), Greek cardiologist and Education minister of Greece.

Greek-language surnames
Surnames